Birkbeck, University of London (formally Birkbeck College, University of London), is a public research university, located in Bloomsbury, London, England, and a member institution of the federal University of London. Established in 1823 as the London Mechanics' Institute by its founder, Sir George Birkbeck, and its supporters, Jeremy Bentham, J. C. Hobhouse and Henry Brougham, Birkbeck is one of the few universities to specialise in evening higher education in the United Kingdom.

Birkbeck's main building is based in the area of Bloomsbury in London Borough of Camden in Central London. Birkbeck offers over 200 undergraduate and postgraduate programmes that can be studied either part-time or full-time, though nearly all lectures are given in the evening. Birkbeck's academic activities are organised into five constituent faculties which are subdivided into nineteen departments. Birkbeck, being part of the University of London, shares the university's academic standards and awards University of London degrees. In common with the other University of London colleges, Birkbeck has also secured its own independent degree-awarding powers, which were confirmed by the Privy Council in July 2012. The quality of degrees awarded by Birkbeck was confirmed by the UK Quality Assurance Agency following institutional audits in 2005 and 2010.

Birkbeck is a member of academic organisations such as the Association of Commonwealth Universities and the European University Association. The university is also a member of the Screen Studies Group, London. The university's Centre for Brain Function and Development was awarded The Queen's Anniversary Prize for its brain research in 2005.

Birkbeck's alumni include five Nobel laureates, numerous political leaders, members of the Parliament of the United Kingdom and a British prime minister.

History

Founding

In 1823, Sir George Birkbeck, a physician and graduate of the University of Edinburgh and an early pioneer of adult education, founded the then "London Mechanics' Institute" at a meeting at the Crown and Anchor Tavern on the Strand. More than two thousand people attended. However the idea was not universally popular and some accused Birkbeck of "scattering the seeds of evil."

In 1825, two years later, the institute moved to the Southampton Buildings on Chancery Lane. In 1830, the first female students were admitted. In 1858, changes to the University of London's structure resulting in an opening up of access to the examinations for its degree. The Institute became the main provider of part-time university education.

In 1866, the Institute changed its name to the Birkbeck Literary and Scientific Institution.

In 1885, Birkbeck moved to the Breams Building, on Fetter Lane, where it would remain for the next sixty-seven years.

In 1904, Birkbeck Students' Union was established.

Birkbeck College
In 1907, Birkbeck's name was shortened to "Birkbeck College". In 1913, a review of the University of London (which had been restructured in 1900) successfully recommended that Birkbeck become a constituent college, although the outbreak of the First World War delayed this until 1920. The Royal Charter was granted in 1926.

In 1921, the college's first female professor, Dame Helen Gwynne-Vaughan, began teaching botany. Other distinguished faculty in the inter-war years included Nikolaus Pevsner, J. D. Bernal, and Cyril Joad.

During the Second World War, Birkbeck was the only central University of London college not to relocate out of the capital. In 1941, the library suffered a direct hit during The Blitz but teaching continued. During the war the college organised lunch time extramural lectures for the public given by, among others, Joad, Pevsner and Harold Nicolson.

In 1952, the college moved to its present location in Malet Street.

Current status
In 2002, the university was rebranded Birkbeck, University of London, having dropped the word College from its preferred name, but Birkbeck College, University of London remains its full legal name. In 2003, following a major redevelopment, its Malet Street building was reopened by the Chancellor of the University of London, The Princess Royal.

In 2006, Birkbeck announced that it had been granted £5 million by the Higher Education Funding Council for England to expand its provision into east London, working with the University of East London. The partnership was formally launched on 21 November 2006 and is called Birkbeck Stratford.

Birkbeck is the largest college of the University of London not to award its own degrees. Although it has held its own degree-awarding powers since 2012, Birkbeck has chosen to hold these in reserve, preferring to award University of London degrees. It also offers many continuing education courses leading to certificates and diplomas, foundation degrees, and short courses.

In late October 2022, the University and College Union published a press release in which it announced that Birkbeck was allegedly planning to significantly reduce its staff due to a multi-million pound deficit, in a restructuring that could lead to compulsory redundancies. In the same release it was revealed that the local UCU branch had passed a motion of no confidence in the senior leadership team. Protests took place at the university in November 2022 at proposed job cuts.  

In 2022 Birkbeck, a history of the University, was published by Oxford University Press to mark its 200 year history.

The School of Continuing Education
In 1876, the London Society for the Extension of University Education was founded, boosting the aims of encouraging working people to undertake higher education. In 1988, the Department of Extra-Mural Studies of the University of London was incorporated into Birkbeck, becoming at first the Centre for Extramural Studies. In 1903, it became the Department of Extra-Mural Studies of the University of London and it was integrated into Birkbeck in 1988 as the School of Continuing Education. In 2009, the Faculty of Lifelong Learning was incorporated into the main College structure.

Campus and location

Birkbeck is principally located between Malet Street and Woburn Square in Bloomsbury, with a number of institutes, teaching hospitals, and scientific laboratories on nearby streets. The Friends House is also partially owned by Birkbeck Law School. The School of Arts, including the Department of English & Humanities, is housed in Virginia Woolf's former Gordon Square residence in Bloomsbury. Other notable former residents of this house include John Maynard Keynes, Vanessa Bell, and Lydia Lopokova. The Gordon Square building includes the Birkbeck Cinema  and the Peltz Gallery.

Many Birkbeck classes are taught at other locations around the Bloomsbury area, due to a combination of Birkbeck's widening participation strategy to make higher education accessible and also because nearly all classes on one day are taught at the same time, resulting in heavy competition for limited space.

Birkbeck expanded into east London, in conjunction with the University of East London. The project is known as Birkbeck Stratford. The campus officially opened in November 2013.

A building on Euston Road has been refurbished by Penoyre & Prasad to be used by Birkbeck in 2021.

In 2021, it was announced that Birkbeck will be leasing Student Central. The building is expected to open in 2024.

Organisation

Faculties and departments

The university consists of five schools that comprise a total of 19 diverse academic departments, which are:

 Department of English, Theatre and Creative Writing
 Department of Cultures and Languages
 Department of History of Art
 Department of Film, Media and Cultural Studies
 Department of Computer Science and Information Systems
 Department of Economics, Mathematics and Statistics
 Department of Management 
 Department of Organizational Psychology
 Department of Law
 Department of Criminology
 Department of Biological Sciences
 Department of Earth and Planetary Sciences
 Department of Psychological Sciences
 Department of Applied Linguistics and Communication
 Department of Geography
 Department of History, Classics and Archaeology
 Department of Philosophy
 Department of Politics
 Department of Psychosocial Studies

Academic profile

Research and teaching
The Birkbeck Institute for the Humanities (BIR) was established in 2004, with the renowned but controversial Slovenian philosopher Slavoj Žižek appointed as International Director. According to its website, the Institute aims to, among other things, "engage with important public issues of our time through a series of open debates, lectures, seminars and conferences" and "foster and promote a climate of interdisciplinary research and collaboration among academics and researchers". The launch of the Institute wasn't without controversy, provoking an article in The Observer newspaper titled "What have intellectuals ever done for the world?" which criticised the ostensible irrelevance and elitism of contemporary public intellectuals. The current director of the institute is Costas Douzinas.
2004 also saw Birkbeck enter into a research and teaching collaboration with the Institute of Education, jointly founding the London Knowledge Lab. This interdisciplinary research institute brings together social scientists and computer scientists to address research questions about technology and learning.

Meanwhile, the London Consortium graduate school — a collaboration between Birkbeck, the Tate Galleries, the Institute of Contemporary Arts, the Architectural Association, and, until 1999, the British Film Institute – has been running since the mid-1990s, offering master's and doctoral degrees in the interdisciplinary humanities and cultural studies, resourced and jointly taught by all the participating institutions. Its permanent and adjunct faculty include figures such as Tom McCarthy, Colin MacCabe, Laura Mulvey, Steven Connor, Marina Warner, Juliet Mitchell, Stuart Hall, Roger Scruton, Salman Rushdie, Tilda Swinton as well as Slavoj Žižek. Its current chair is Anthony Julius.

Since 2003, when David Latchman of UCL became Master of the Birkbeck, he has forged closer relations between these two University of London colleges, and personally maintains departments at both. Joint research centres include the UCL/Birkbeck Institute for Earth and Planetary Sciences, UCL/Birkbeck/IoE Centre for Educational Neuroscience, UCL/Birkbeck Institute of Structural and Molecular Biology, and Birkbeck-UCL Centre for Neuroimaging.

Science research at Birkbeck has a notable tradition. Physicist David Bohm who made notable contributions to the theory of Quantum mechanics was professor of Theoretical Physics from 1961 to 1987,  Nobel Laureates Aaron Klug at the Department of crystallography, Derek Barton at the Department of Chemistry together with eminent physicist Roger Penrose and David Bohm at the Department of Physics. Computer scientist Kathleen Booth wrote the first assembly language. Birkbeck is part of the Institute of Structural Molecular Biology, which includes the Bloomsbury Centre for Structural biology, established in 1998.  This is a collaborative venture between Birkbeck College and University College London and is a leading academic centre for translating gene sequences and determining protein structure and function.  It also includes the Bloomsbury Centre for Bioinformatics, a collaborative venture also between Birkbeck College and University College London for research into Bioinformatics, Genomics, Systems Biology, Grid computing and Text mining.

Birkbeck was ranked 13th in The Guardian's 2001 Research Assessment Exercise and 26th in the Times Higher Education's equivalent table. In the 2008 RAE results, Birkbeck ranked in the top 25% of UK multi-faculty Higher Education Institutions. The RAE rated the quality of research in a range of subjects at 159 Higher Education Institutions in the UK. Birkbeck submissions from Earth Sciences, Psychology, History, Classics and Archaeology and History of Art, Film and Visual Media were rated in the top five nationally. In REF2014, half of Birkbeck's submissions were rated in the top 20 nationally, and eight submissions received 100% ranking for Research Environment. 73% of Birkbeck's research was rated "world-leading" (4*) or "internationally excellent" (3*). In the #REF2021 exercise, Birkbeck performed very well throughout, with notable success in English Language & Literature, where Birkbeck was second nationally, and Art and Design, where Birkbeck was fourth nationally.

Rankings 

Birkbeck's Centre for Brain Function and Development was awarded The Queen's Anniversary Prize for its brain research in 2005. In 2010, Birkbeck was shortlisted for the Times Higher Education University of the Year Award.

In 2021, the Times Higher Education World University Rankings ranked Birkbeck 95th in the world for Psychology. The university is consistently ranked in the top 100 in the world by QS World University Rankings for English Language & Literature and Philosophy. Internationally, Birkbeck is ranked within the top 350 universities in the world by the Times Higher Education World University Rankings 2020 and QS World University Rankings 2020.

In 2018, Birkbeck announced that it will withdraw from UK university rankings because their methodologies unfairly penalise it, since "despite having highly rated teaching and research, other factors caused by its unique teaching model and unrelated to its performance push it significantly down the ratings".

Students' Union

The Birkbeck Students' Union (BBKSU) was founded in 1904 and was one of the founding members of the National Union of Students.

Initially governed by a Council, elected from and responsible to the students, today it is governed jointly by a Student Council, Executive Committee and Board of Trustees.

Students initially paid an annual membership fee to join, but students are now automatically registered as members when they enrol onto a course at the college.

Birkbeck Students' Union offers a number of student groups for students, as well as a various sports clubs that compete in the LUSL. It also provides student representation, support and advice services, as well as volunteer and employment opportunities.

Notable people

Rosalind Franklin, British scientist.
Eric Kaufmann (1970), Canadian professor of politics.
Samir El-Youssef writer and critic.
Julia Goldsworthy, British Liberal Democrat politician and former Member of Parliament.
J. Philippe Rushton, Canadian psychologist and author.
Tracey Emin, British artist.
Leonard Mandel, (PhD, 1951) American professor of physics.
Delcy Rodríguez, Venezuelan politician.
Romesh Ranganathan, British comedian and actor.
Ed Davey (MSc Economics, 1993): British Liberal Democrat Member of Parliament and former Secretary of State for Energy and Climate Change.
Sidney Webb, British economist. 
Richard Sambrook, British journalist and former BBC executive.
Nissim Ezekiel, Indian poet & Sahitya Akademi Award winner
Kitty Ussher, British economist and former Labour Member of Parliament. 
Alex Corbisiero, Rugby union player.
Gloria De Piero, journalist and former Labour Member of Parliament. 
Lisa Nandy, British Labour Member of Parliament. 
Annie Besant, British socialist, theosophist, women's rights activist, writer and philanthropist.
Nick Smith, Welsh Labour Member of Parliament. 
Philippa Forrester, British television and radio presenter and author.
Jenny Rowe, Chief Executive of the United Kingdom Supreme Court.
Denis MacShane, British former Labour Member of Parliament.
Shirley Toulson, British poet and author.
Judith Eagle, English children's author.

See also
 Armorial of UK universities
 List of universities in the UK
 Ruskin College

References

External links

 
 Birkbeck, University of London student lists
 Birkbeck, University of London military personnel,1914–1918

 
University of London
Educational institutions established in 1823
1823 establishments in England
Buildings and structures in Bloomsbury
Universities UK